Dmytro Mykolaiovych Tolkunov (born 27 May 1979) is a Ukrainian ice hockey defender who competed at the 2002 Winter Olympics and at the 2002, 2004, 2005, 2009 and 2010 world championships. He played for Ukrainian, Russian, Belarusian, Hungarian, Canadian and American clubs, and won the Ukrainian national title in 2011, 2012 and 2015.

Career statistics

Regular season and playoffs

International

References

1979 births
Living people
Amur Khabarovsk players
Beauport Harfangs players
Bilyi Bars Bila Tserkva players
Cleveland Lumberjacks players
Ferencvárosi TC (ice hockey) players
HC Berkut players
HC Dinamo Minsk players
HC Donbass players
HC Sibir Novosibirsk players
HK ATEK Kyiv players
Hull Olympiques players
Ice hockey players at the 2002 Winter Olympics
Lokomotiv Yaroslavl players
Metallurg Novokuznetsk players
Norfolk Admirals players
Olympic ice hockey players of Ukraine
Quebec Remparts players
Sokil Kyiv players
Yunost Minsk players
Ukrainian ice hockey defencemen
Ukrainian expatriate sportspeople in Canada
Ukrainian expatriate sportspeople in the United States
Ukrainian expatriate sportspeople in Hungary
Ukrainian expatriate sportspeople in Russia
Ukrainian expatriate sportspeople in Belarus
Ukrainian expatriate sportspeople in Romania
Expatriate ice hockey players in Romania
Expatriate ice hockey players in Belarus
Expatriate ice hockey players in Hungary
Expatriate ice hockey players in Russia
Expatriate ice hockey players in the United States
Expatriate ice hockey players in Canada
Ukrainian expatriate ice hockey people